Events from the year 1938 in Spain.

Incumbents
President: Manuel Azaña
Prime Minister: Juan Negrín

Events
February 5–7 - Battle of Alfambra
March 5–6 - Battle of Cape Palos
March 7-April 19 - Aragon Offensive
March 16–17 - Battle of Caspe
March 16–19 - Bombing of Barcelona
April 1–3 - Battle of Gandesa (1938)
April 14-June 16 - Battle of Bielsa pocket
May 25 - Bombing of Alicante
May 31 - Bombing of Granollers
July 25-November 16 - Battle of the Ebro
November 7 - Bombing of Cabra

Births
January 5 - Juan Carlos I of Spain
May 10 - Manuel Santana, tennis player (d. 2021)
July 28 - Luis Aragones, football player and manager (d. 2014)

Deaths
11 January - Juan de la Cierva y Peñafiel, lawyer and politician (b. 1864)
29 January - Armando Palacio Valdés, writer (b. 1853)
9 April - Manuel Carrasco Formiguera (b. 1890)
14 May - Miguel Cabanellas (b. 1872)

See also
List of Spanish films of the 1930s

References

 
1930s in Spain
Years of the 20th century in Spain